A Magdalene of the Hills is a 1917 American silent drama film directed by John W. Noble and starring William Garwood as Eric Southward, Mabel Taliaferro, and Frank Montgomery.

The film today is lost.

Cast
Mabel Taliaferro as Renie Mathis
William Garwood as Eric Southard
Frank Montgomery as Old Mathis
William B. Davidson as Bud Weaver
William Black as Herbert Grayson
Charles Brown as Len Mathis

References

External links

1917 drama films
1917 films
Silent American drama films
American silent feature films
American black-and-white films
Films directed by John W. Noble
Lost American films
Metro Pictures films
1917 lost films
Lost drama films
1910s American films